Carlos López de Silanes (born April 18, 1970) is a Mexican former footballer who played as a defender. He was a member of the Mexico national football team competing at the 1992 Summer Olympics in Barcelona, Spain. He had a brief spell in English football, making 2 substitute appearances for Chester City in the Football Conference, and a single appearance for Wycombe Wanderers in The Football League.

References
playerhistory

1970 births
Living people
Association football defenders
Olympic footballers of Mexico
Footballers at the 1992 Summer Olympics
Footballers from Mexico City
Chester City F.C. players
Wycombe Wanderers F.C. players
Mexican footballers
Mexican expatriate footballers
Expatriate footballers in England
Mexican expatriate sportspeople in England
English Football League players